Stoklasa is a surname. Notable people with the surname include:

Filip Stoklasa (born 1990), Czech ice hockey player
Lutz Stoklasa (born 1949), German swimmer
Mike Stoklasa, American filmmaker and critic, founder of RedLetterMedia

See also
 
Stoklosa Alumni Field, a baseball field in Lowell, Massachusetts, United States
Stocklasa, a surname
Stokłosa, a surname

Czech-language surnames